Nayini (Na'ini), or Biyabanak, is one of the Central Iranian varieties of Iran, one of five listed in Ethnologue that together have 35,000 speakers. 

Anarak dialect is divergent. Other dialects, or closely related languages, are Abchuya'i, Keyjani and Tudeshki. Sources differ on whether Zefra'i is a dialect of Nayini or of Gazi.

Ethnologue provisionally lists Khuri as a dialect. However, that appears to belong to a different branch of Central Iranian.

References

Western Iranian languages